= Nihon Koku =

Nihon Koku may refer to:

- the formal name of Japan: 日本国 (Nihon Koku)
- Japan Airlines: 日本航空株式会社 (Nihon Kōkū Kabushiki-gaisha, Japan Airlines Co., Ltd.)
